Ella Simmons is a Seventh-day Adventist administrator and educator. As the only woman to be a vice president of the General Conference of Seventh-day Adventists, she is the highest ranking female official in the history of the denomination, with the exception of three woman treasurers in the pioneer era.

Background
Ella Louise (née Smith) Simmons was born in Louisville, Kentucky. She earned her Bachelor's in Elementary Education from Indiana University Southeast, a Master's in Education from Andrews University, and a doctorate in Education from the University of Louisville. She is married to Nord Simmons, a retired high school teacher, and the couple has two sons, Darryl and Christopher, also educators.

Career
Simmons served in various capacities as an educator for almost thirty years. For the first decade of her career Simmons was variously a high school teacher and principal in schools in Kentucky and Indiana. From 1988-1990 she was the chair of the Department of Education at Kentucky State University. She was an assistant professor in the School of Education at the University of Louisville from 1990-1997, serving as associate dean of the School of Education in the last two years. In 1997 she became the vice president for academic affairs at Oakwood University in Huntsville, Alabama. From 2000-2004 she was the Provost and Vice President for Academic Administration at La Sierra University in Riverside, California.

At the 2005 General Conference session of Seventh-day Adventists Ella Simmons was elected a general vice president of the world church, thus becoming the highest ranking woman in the history of the denomination, with the exception of three woman treasurers in the pioneer era. Simmons' tenure has been marked by her leading role in shaping the global educational system of the now 22 million-member church. She has also become an icon for woman empowerment in a church grappling with the issue of the ordination of women, and is outspoken in favor of ordination without respect to gender.

See also

 General Conference of Seventh-day Adventists
 University of Louisville
 Kentucky State University
 Andrews University
 Oakwood University
 La Sierra University
 Seventh-day Adventist Church
 North American Division

References

External links
 University of Louisville
 Kentucky State University
 Oakwood University
 Andrews University
 La Sierra University
 General Conference of Seventh-day Adventist Church

Seventh-day Adventist administrators
American Seventh-day Adventists
Seventh-day Adventist religious workers
Living people
University of Louisville alumni
Andrews University alumni
Year of birth missing (living people)